Lon Milo DuQuette (born July 11, 1948), also known as Rabbi Lamed Ben Clifford and by his neo-Gnostic bishop title of Tau Lamed, is an American writer, lecturer, musician, and occultist, best known as an author who applies humor in the field of Western Hermeticism.

Early life 
Lon Milo DuQuette was born in Long Beach, California and raised in Columbus, Nebraska. He was an aspiring studio musician and recording artist in the 1970s, releasing two singles and an album, Charley D. and Milo, on the Epic Records label. He and his partner Charles Dennis Harris, aka Charley Packard (now deceased), opened for Hoyt Axton, Arlo Guthrie and performed with Sammy Davis Jr.

Career
In 1972, DuQuette quit the music business and for the next 25 years he pursued his interest in mysticism, particularly the work of Aleister Crowley (1875–1947). He is on the faculty of the Omega Institute for Holistic Studies in Rhinebeck, New York where he teaches The Western Magical Tradition.

Ordo Templi Orientis
Since 1975 DuQuette has been a National and International governing officer of Ordo Templi Orientis, a religious and fraternal organization founded in the early part of the 20th century. Since 1996 he has been O.T.O.'s United States Deputy Grand Master. He is also an Archbishop of Ecclesia Gnostica Catholica, the ecclesiastical arm of O.T.O.

Writing 
DuQuette began writing professionally in 1988 and has since published 19 books (translated in 12 languages). Many of his books have been dedicated to analyzing and exploring the works of Aleister Crowley, an English occultist, author, poet and philosopher. He has written a number of successful books on topics in the Western mystical tradition including: Freemasonry, Tarot, Qabalah, ceremonial magick, the Enochian magick of Dr. John Dee, and Goetic spirit evocation. He is perhaps best known as "an author who injects humor into the serious subjects of magick and the occult." His autobiography, My Life with the Spirits, is currently a required text for two classes at DePaul University, Chicago.

Return to music
A 2005 gift of a ukulele re-ignited DuQuette's interest in music.  Two self-released CDs and a new record contract followed.  In 2012, DuQuette released I'm Baba Lon on Ninety Three Records, his first studio album in 40 years. On September 3, 2012, Ninety Three released the follow-up, Baba Lon II.

Personal life
DuQuette is married to his high school sweetheart, Constance Jean Duquette. They live in Costa Mesa, California and have one son.

Works

Books
DuQuette, Lon Milo: & Aleister Crowley, Christopher Hyatt: Enochian World of Aleister Crowley: Enochian Sex Magick, New Falcon, 1991.
DuQuette, Lon Milo: & Christopher Hyatt: Sex Magic, Tantra & Tarot: The Way of the Secret Lover, New Falcon, 1991.
DuQuette, Lon Milo: & Aleister Crowley, Christopher Hyatt: Aleister Crowley's Illustrated Goetia: Sexual Evocation, New Falcon, 1992.
DuQuette, Lon Milo: Tarot of Ceremonial Magick: A Pictorial Synthesis of Three Great Pillars of Magick: Enochian, Goetia, Astrology, Weiser Books, 1995.
DuQuette, Lon Milo: Angels, Demons & Gods of the New Millennium, Weiser Books, 1997.
DuQuette, Lon Milo: My Life With the Spirits: The Adventures of a Modern Magician, Weiser Books, 1999.
DuQuette, Lon Milo: The Chicken Qabalah of Rabbi Lamed Ben Clifford: Dilettante's Guide to What You Do and Do Not Need to Know to Become a Qabalist, Weiser Books, 2001.
DuQuette, Lon Milo: The Magick of Aleister Crowley: A Handbook of the Rituals of Thelema, Weiser Books, 2003.
DuQuette, Lon Milo: Understanding Aleister Crowley's Thoth Tarot, Weiser Books, 2003.
DuQuette, Lon Milo: The Book Of Ordinary Oracles, Weiser Books, 2005.
DuQuette, Lon Milo: The Key to Solomon's Key: Secrets of Magic and Masonry, Ccc Publishing, 2006.
DuQuette, Lon Milo: Accidental Christ: The Story of Jesus as Told by His Uncle, Thelema Aura Publishing, 2007.
DuQuette, Lon Milo: Enochian Vision Magick, Weiser Books, 2008.
DuQuette, Lon Milo: Low Magick: It's All In Your Head... You Just Have No Idea How Big Your Head Is, Llewellyn Publications, 2010.
DuQuette, Lon Milo: Ask Baba Lon: Answers to Questions of Life & Magick, New Falcon Publications, 2011.
DuQuette, Lon Milo & Bratkowsky, James M: "Revolt of the Magicians", Orobas Press, 2011.
DuQuette, Lon Milo: "Homemade Magick: The Musings & Mischief of a Do-It-Yourself Magus, Llewellyn Publications, 2014.
DuQuette, Lon Milo: "Son of Chicken Qabalah: Rabbi Lamed Ben Clifford's Mostly Painless Qabalah Course", Weiser Books, 2018.
DuQuette, Lon Milo: "Allow Me To Introduce: An Insider's Guide to the Occult" Weiser Books, 2020.

MusicCharley D. And Milo—Charley D. Harris and Lon Milo DuQuette, Epic, 1970.I'm Baba Lon, Ninety Three Records, 2012.Baba Lon II, Ninety Three Records, 2012.Gentle Heretic, Ninety Three Records, 2013.Sweet Baba Lon, Ninety Three Records, 2015.

Other mediaLon Milo DuQuette's Enochian Magick - The Art of Angelic Evocation, Hooded Man Productions. 1994.Magical Egypt, Cydonia, Inc. 2000.Qabalah For the Rest of Us, Cydonia, Inc. 2002.The Great Work, Cydonia, Inc. 2008.Lon Milo DuQuette Live and Uncensored—Tarot Kabbalah & Oracles, Cydonia, Inc. 2005.The Call—Dieter Müh and Lon Milo Duquette, HaemOccult, 2009.Tarot of Ceremonial Magic Deck which was revised 2020 by Next Millennium

See also
 English Qaballa
 Members of OTO

Notes

External links

Duquette's Writers Net Profile
PaganNews.com Interview with Lon Milo Duquette
OC Music Scene Interview

1948 births
Living people
20th-century American male musicians
20th-century American male writers
20th-century American non-fiction writers
21st-century American male musicians
21st-century American male writers
21st-century American non-fiction writers
American Thelemites
American occult writers
Enochian magic
Members of Ordo Templi Orientis
Musicians from Long Beach, California
People from Columbus, Nebraska
Writers from Long Beach, California
Writers from Nebraska